Samba Koné (born 22 March 2002) is a Malian professional footballer who plays as a midfielder for Porto B, on loan from Derby Académie.

Career statistics

Club

Notes

References

2001 births
Living people
Malian footballers
Association football forwards
Liga Portugal 2 players
CD Leganés players
CD Leganés B players
FC Porto players
FC Porto B players
Malian expatriate footballers
Malian expatriate sportspeople in Spain
Expatriate footballers in Spain
Malian expatriate sportspeople in Portugal
Expatriate footballers in Portugal
21st-century Malian people